U.S. Route 12 (US-12) is a United States Numbered Highway in North Central Idaho. It extends  from the Washington state line in Lewiston east to the Montana state line at Lolo Pass, generally along the route of the Lewis and Clark Expedition, and is known as the Northwest Passage Scenic Byway. It was previously known as the Lewis and Clark Highway.

Route description

US-12 enters Idaho at the Washington state line in Lewiston, Nez Perce County, crossing the Snake River at the state line. It heads east through Lewiston, turning north to cross the Clearwater River and intersect State Highway 128 (SH-128). It continues east to overlap US-95 along a limited-access section.

US-12 then continues east along the north bank of the Clearwater River through northern Lapwai, past the Ant and Yellowjacket rock formation and a historical marker for the Spalding Mission. It intersects SH-3 near Arrow and crosses the Clearwater River again.

US-12 then continues east along the south bank of the Clearwater River past historical markers commemorating Indian houses and the ghost town of Slaterville, and, in a rest area at Lenore, a historical marker for the Lenore Tram.

Entering Clearwater County, US-12 continues east along the south bank of the Clearwater River through Orofino. Just after leaving Orofino, it briefly overlaps SH-7, then continues southeast along the south bank of the Clearwater River, past a historical marker for the point where Lewis and Clark first found a western-flowing river.

In Lewis County, US-12 continues southeast along the south bank of the Clearwater River, intersecting SH-11 at Greer and passing a historical marker for a ferry operated in the original 1860 goldrush. It then continues southeast into Kamiah, where it intersects SH-162. It then crosses the Clearwater River again and leaves Kamiah.

It then enters Idaho County and continues south along the north bank of the Clearwater River, crossing the Nez Perce National Historical Park. It then continues south along the north bank of the Clearwater River, intersecting SH-13 across the river from Kooskia. The highway then turns east along the north bank of the Clearwater River, passing a historical marker commemorating the camp of Nez Perce led by Looking Glass, and the 1877 attack by the U.S. Army on July 1 that provoked Looking Glass to join the Nez Perce retreat with Chief Joseph. It continues east along the north bank of the Clearwater River, leaving the Nez Perce reservation. US-12 then continues to Lowell, where it turns northeast along the north bank of the Lochsa River through the Bitterroot Mountains.

From there it descends past Lolo Hot Springs to Lolo, the junction with US-93, near the site of Lewis and Clark's Traveler's Rest.

History

US-12 was created in 1925 as part of the original system of U.S. Highways, and its original western terminus was in Miles City, Montana. In 1962, the highway was extended west to Lewiston, ending at the former US-410. In 1967, it was extended to its current western terminus in Aberdeen, Washington, with the Idaho section taking its current route.

The Lewis and Clark Highway, from Lewiston eastward to Lolo Pass, was designated SH-9 in 1916 and construction began in 1920.

By late 1955,  remained unfinished, and, upon its completion in 1962, it was redesignated US 12. At the dedication ceremony at Lolo Pass attended by thousands on August 19, the states' governors, Robert E. Smylie of Idaho and Tim Babcock of Montana, cut through a ceremonial western redcedar log at Packers Meadow with a two-man crosscut saw.

The bridge crossing the Clearwater River near Arrow opened for traffic in early 1973. The route previously was on the river's south bank between the bridge and Spalding, where it crossed on the old Spalding bridge; damaged by ice jams 10 years earlier, it was dismantled shortly after the Arrow bridge opened.

Equipment shipments

US-12 through Idaho has been proposed as a route for shipment of huge equipment from Lewiston, an inland port, to oil sands facilities near Fort McMurray, Alberta and to a refinery in Billings, Montana. The route is preferable to other routes due to the lack of underpasses and the great distances involved. The alternative is transport across the Great Plains from Texas or New Orleans. On US-12, the major obstacles were powerlines, which had to be raised or buried. That and other alterations to the highway such as turnouts would be paid for by the companies. The trucks would transport only at night, moving short distances between places where they would pull off and let traffic pass. A permit granted by the Idaho Transportation Department to ConocoPhillips in August 2010 is the subject of litigation initiated by householders along the route. On January 19, 2011, it was announced that the Idaho government would issue permits for four loads of refinery equipment to be transported from Lewiston to Billings.

The Port of Lewiston is the furthest inland seaport in the Western U.S. It ships wheat, barley, and legumes to Asia and the South Pacific as well as the Middle East and Africa. There are also inland seaports in Washington at the port of Clarkston and Port of Wilma in Whitman County.

Major intersections

References

External links

Lewiston Morning Tribune – Lewis & Clark Highway edition – 3 sections, 80 pages – August 19, 1962

Transportation in Nez Perce County, Idaho
Transportation in Clearwater County, Idaho
Transportation in Lewis County, Idaho
Transportation in Idaho County, Idaho
012
 Idaho